Museums and Women and Other Stories is a collection of 25 works of short fiction by John Updike, first appearing individually in literary journals. The stories were collected by Alfred A. Knopf in 1972.

Stories
The stories in Museums and Women first appeared in The New Yorker, unless otherwise noted.

 "Museums and Women" (November 18, 1967)
 "The Hillies" (December 20, 1969)
 "The Deacon" (February 21, 1970)
 "I Will Not Let Thee Go, Except Thou Bless Me" (October 11, 1969)
 "The Corner" (May 24, 1969)
 "The Witnesses" (August 13, 1966)
 "Solitaire" (January 22, 1972)
 "The Orphaned Swimming Pool" (June 27, 1970)
 "When Everyone Was Pregnant" (Audience, November–December 1971)
 "Man and Daughter in the Cold" (March 9, 1968)
 "During the Jurassic" (The Transatlantic Review, Summer 1966)
 "I Am Dying, Egypt, Dying" (Playboy, September 1969)
 "The Carol Sing" (December 19, 1970)
 "Plumbing" (February 20, 1971)
 "The Sea’s Green Sameness" (New World Writing,  Fall 1960)
 "The Pro" (September 17, 1966)
 "The Slump" (Esquire, July 1968)
 "Under the Microscope" (The Transatlantic Review, Spring 1968)
 "The Day of the Dying Rabbit" (August 30, 1969)
 "Cemeteries" (The Transatlantic Review, Summer 1969)
 "One of My Generation" (November 15, 1969)
 "The Baluchitherium" (August 14, 1971)
 "The Invention of the Horse Collar" (The Transatlantic Review, Spring-Summer 1972)
 "Jesus on Honshu" (December 25, 1971)
 "God Speaks" (Esquire, September 1965 [titled "Deus Dixit"])

Reception

As to the critical response to Museums and Women, appraisals of the collection were few "perhaps because reviewers felt there was not really much to say" according to literary critic William R. Macnaughton. The collection is composed of 25 tales, of which 10 are sketches and fables, and 5 more that continue the To Far to Go: The Maples Stories saga of Joan and Richard Maple.

Literary critic Tony Tanner writing in The New York Times Book Review offers a  mixed appraisal of the collection. Tanner notes:

Tanner adds that "most of the stories are extremely readable, not one of them without some moments of dazzling minute observation…some abrupt accuracy about the harassments and consolations of day-to-day living…The thought occurred to me that Updike may be a better short-story writer than he is a novelist…"

Literary critic Robert M Luscher reports that Updike's skill at developing his characters has not diminished in this volume, but rather chronicles a decline in the circumstances of his protagonists.:

Style and Theme

Novelist Joyce Carol Oates locates the key thematic elements of the collection in its title:

The title story "Museums and Woman" reveals that the narrator's mother introduced him to museums when he was a child, attempting to instill in the boy a sense of his own destiny. Literary critic Mary Allen writes:

The stories in Museums and Women are narrated by the fictional character William Young, "an Updike alter ego", who offers a "meditative reminiscence" of six women he had accompanied to art museums.  Literary critic Robert Detwieler writes:

Footnotes

Sources 
Allen, Mary. 1976. John Updike’s Love of "Dull Bovine Beauty" from The Necessary Blankness: Women in Major American Fiction of the Sixties. University of Illinois Press (1976), in John Updike: Modern Critical Views (1987), Harold Bloom, editor. pp. 69–95 
Carduff, Christopher.  2013.  Note on the Texts in John Updike: Collected Early Stories. Christopher Carduff, editor. The Library of America. pp. 910–924 
Detweiler, Robert. 1984. John Updike. Twayne Publishers, G. K. Hall & Co., Boston, Massachusetts.  (Paperback).
Luscher, Robert M. 1993. John Updike: A Study of the Short Fiction. Twayne Publishers, New York. 
Macnaughton, William R. 1982. Critical Essays on John Updike. G. K. Hall & Co., Boston, Massachusetts.  
Oates, Joyce Carol. 1975. Updike's American Comedies from Modern Fiction Studies 21, Fall 1975, Purdue Research Foundation, in John Updike: Modern Critical Views, Harold Bloom, editor. pp. 57–68 
Olster, Stacey. 2006. The Cambridge Companion to John Updike. Cambridge University Press, Cambridge.  (paperback)
Tanner, Tony. 1972. Review of Museum and Women and Other Stories from The New York Times Review of Books, 22 October 1972  in Critical Essays on John Updike. G. K. Hall & Co. (1982), William R. Macnaughton editor. pp. 71–75. 

Short story collections by John Updike
1972 short story collections
Works originally published in The New Yorker
Alfred A. Knopf books